Cannabis in North Carolina is illegal for any use except for very limited medical usage, though decriminalized for possession of 0.5 ounces or less.

Decriminalization (1977)
In 1977, during a short-lived wave of decriminalization in the country, North Carolina reduced the penalty and decriminalized possession of small amounts of cannabis with  0.5 ounces or less to a maximum of a $200 fine.

Failed medical legalization (2014)
A medical marijuana bill was introduced in May, 2014, but was killed by the House Committee in March, 2015. Additionally, the House Committee issued an "unfavorable report", which blocks the House from considering bills with medical marijuana components for the next two years. Non-psychoactive cannabis has essentially become legalized, but special seeds of very specific low THC strains (industrial hemp) and licensing must be purchased from the state.

Legalization of CBD (2015)
In 2015, Governor Pat McCrory signed into law HB766, allowing those with intractable epilepsy to use CBD oil. His endorsement followed a House vote of 112–22 and Senate vote of 47–0.  The law does not establish any infrastructure for which potential patients may legally purchase CBD within the state.

Legalization of hemp (2017)

References

 
North Carolina
Crime in North Carolina
North Carolina culture
Politics of North Carolina